Visual Audio is the debut studio album by English dance music DJ and music producer State of Bengal, released on 29 March 1999 by One Little Indian.

Critical response

John Bush of AllMusic rated Visual Audio 3.5/5 and described it as "...a full-length of intriguing fusion, the harnessing of British club culture's drum'n'bass breakbeats with more traditional Indian sounds." Rob Evanoff of All About Jazz said, "If you are into an adventurous combination of both ancient and new world music mixed with the continuous energy of modern beats then strap your mind in and let the flight begin."

Vinita Ramani of Exclaim! said, "...Zaman manages the transition and mood as the myriad instruments drop out and allow for his talents as a DJ/producer to emerge." Biz of EthnoTechno said of the album, "Folk instrumental melodies, phat beats, mesmerizing loops, and swirling flourishes of sonic waves. Have yourself a taste!"

Track listing

References

External links

1999 debut albums
Bengali-language albums
State of Bengal albums
Trip hop albums by English artists
Nu jazz albums